The 2014 World Long Distance Mountain Running Challenge was the 11th edition of the global Mountain running competition, World Long Distance Mountain Running Championships, organised by the World Mountain Running Association.

Results

Individual

Men

Women

Team

Men

Women

References

External links
 

World Long Distance Mountain Running Championships
World Long Distance Mountain Running